is a mountain to the north of the Japanese city of Kyoto. It is the birthplace of the Reiki practice, and is said to be the home of Sōjōbō, King of the Tengu (Goblins).

Kurama is also the location of the annual , which takes place every October.
 is now designated as a national treasure of Japan.

Goblin king
Sōjōbō was supposedly the Tengu who taught swordsmanship to Minamoto no Yoshitsune. 

The philosopher Hayashi Razan lists one of the three greatest of the daitengu as Sōjōbō of Mount Kurama. The demons of Kurama and Atago are among the most famous tengu.

Holistic healing
The mountain is also known as the birthplace of the holistic healing art called Reiki. In 1922 the founder of Reiki, Mikao Usui, meditated for 21 days on this mountain and received the Reiki healing energy and became an enlightened person and thus also true insight into the wisdom of life.  Mikao Usui meditated near the top of the mountain at a site called Osugi Gongen, at the site of a great sacred tree (kami) said to be an incarnation of the god Maoson.

See also
 Kurama-tengu

References

 Geographical Survey Institute

Kurama